Berwick Township may refer to the following townships in the United States:

 Berwick Township, Warren County, Illinois
 Berwick Township, Newton County, Missouri
 Berwick Township, Adams County, Pennsylvania